Sir Henry Howarth Bashford  (13 January 1880 – 15 August 1961) was a distinguished English physician, becoming Honorary Physician to King George VI. He was also an author, most notably of satirical novels.

Early life

Bashford was born in Kensington, London on 13 January 1880 the son of Frederick Bashford and Henrietta Eleanor, daughter of the Rev. Henry Howarth, Rector of St George's, Hanover Square and Chaplain in Ordinary to Queen Victoria.  On his paternal side, his grandfather  Lt. J. Bashford (later Captain), Royal Navy, was mentioned in the official list of the wounded at the Battle of Trafalgar in which he took part on board .

Bashford was educated at Bedford Modern School, the University of London and the London Hospital.

Career

Bashford was Chief Medical Officer to the Post Office (1933–43) and subsequently Treasury Medical Adviser (1943–45).  He was Honorary Physician to King George VI (1941–44) and was the late Honorary President of the Post Office Ambulance Centre, St. John Ambulance Association.  He was created a knight-bachelor of the Order of St. John of Jerusalem, announced in the King’s birthday honours on 9 June 1938.

Writing

Bashford is now remembered as a writer, in particular of the satirical Augustus Carp, Esq., By Himself: Being the Autobiography of a Really Good Man (1924), which was first published anonymously. He also wrote some popular poetry.

Family life

In 1908 Bashford married Margaret Eveline, daughter of Ernest Sutton of Basildon, Berkshire.  They had one son and three daughters.  Bashford died in Easton Royal on 15 August 1961.

Sir Henry is celebrated by a blue plaque in the village of Easton Royal, his last resting place, where he was the much-loved village historian and benefactor.

The National Portrait Gallery has a photographic bromide print portrait of Sir Henry.

Works

Tommy Wideawake (1903)
The Manitoban: A Romance (1904)
The Pilgrims' March (1909)
The corner of Harley Street: being some familiar correspondence of Peter Harding, M.D. (1911)
Vagabonds In Périgord (1914)
Pity the poor blind (1917)
Sons Of Admiralty: A Short History Of The Naval War 1914-1918 with Archibald Hurd (1919)
The Heroic Record of the British Navy with A. Hurd (1920)
Half-Past Bedtime (1922)
Augustus Carp, Esq., By Himself: Being the Autobiography of a Really Good Man (1924)
The Happy Ghost and Other Stories (1925)
Behind The Fog (1927)
The Harley Street Calendar (1929)
The Student Life And Other Essays (Intro to work by William Ostler) (1931)
The Man On Ben Na Garve [Short story in The Second Century Of Detective Stories Ed EC Bentley] (1938)
Doctors In Shirt Sleeves (1940)
Fisherman's Progress (1946)
Wiltshire Harvest (1953)
Easton Royal: A Short History 
Lodgings For Twelve 
The Plain Girl's Tale 
Songs Out Of School

He also wrote as Peter Harding.

References

External links
 
 
 

1880 births
People educated at Bedford Modern School
1961 deaths
English satirists
Knights Bachelor
Knights of Grace of the Order of St John
20th-century English medical doctors
English male poets
20th-century English poets
British medical writers
20th-century English male writers
People from Kensington